The Relief Church (or Presbytery of Relief) was a Scottish Presbyterian denomination founded in 1761. In 1847 it united with the United Secession Church to form the United Presbyterian Church of Scotland.

In relation to the history of the Church of Scotland it is known as the Second Secession: relating to the First Secession of 1733.

History
The church was founded by Thomas Gillespie, a former minister of the Church of Scotland.  He had been deposed by the General Assembly in 1752 after he refused to participate in inducting a minister to the Inverkeithing parish since the parishioners opposed the appointment. Gillespie was joined by Thomas Boston of Oxnam and Thomas Colier of Westmoreland. They held the first meeting of the Presbytery of Relief at Colinsburgh in Fife in 1761. The name was chosen to mean relief from the patronage that was common in the Church of Scotland at the time.

The Relief body was liberal, welcoming independents, Episcopalians and other devout men to join them. In 1766 the distinguished minister James Baine resigned from his presbytery of Paisley and joined the Relief Church. In his letter of resignation Baine asserted that his faith and belief in his former creed was unchanged, but he was resigning due to abuses of church power.

The number of congregations grew rapidly, and a Relief Synod was formed in 1773, which in 1847 had under its jurisdiction 136 congregations. The Relief Church issued no distinctive testimonies, and a certain breadth of view was shown in the formal declaration of their terms of communion, first made in 1773, which allowed occasional communion with those of the Episcopal and Independent persuasion.

In 1794 the Relief Church adopted as its hymn-book Patrick Hutchison's Sacred Songs and Hymns on Various Passages of Scripture, and it was Hutchison who established the first systematic definition of the Relief Church's beliefs.

A Relief theological hall was instituted in 1824. In 1847 a union was formed between all the congregations of the United Secession Church and 118 out of 136 of the Relief Churches, in what now became the United Presbyterian Church.

References

Sources

Presbyterian denominations in Scotland
Religious organizations established in 1761
1761 establishments in Scotland
1847 disestablishments
Former Presbyterian denominations
Church of Scotland